Hop on Pop is a 1963 children's picture book by Dr. Seuss (Theodor Seuss Geisel), published as part of the Random House Beginner Books series. The book is subtitled "The Simplest Seuss for Youngest Use", and contains several short poems about a variety of characters designed to introduce basic phonics concepts to children.

History
One of Geisel's manuscript drafts for the book contained the lines, "When I read I am smart / I always cut whole words apart. / Con Stan Tin O Ple, Tim Buk Too / Con Tra Cep Tive, Kan Ga Roo". Geisel had included the contraceptive reference to ensure that publisher Bennett Cerf was reading the manuscript. Cerf did notice the line, and the poem was changed to the following: "My father /  can read / big words, too. / Like... / Constantinople / and / Timbuktu".

Reception
A popular choice of elementary school teachers and children's librarians, Hop on Pop ranked sixteenth on Publishers Weekly's 2001 list of the all-time best-selling hardcover books for children. Based on a 2007 online poll, the National Education Association listed the book as one of their "Teachers' Top 100 Books for Children".

One of Hop on Pop’s most notable advocates is former United States First Lady Laura Bush, who listed the book as her favourite in a 2006 Wall Street Journal article. Laura said this book with its illustrations and rhymes delighted her and her husband George and their daughters Barbara and Jenna after reading it.

In 2013, an official complaint was made to the Toronto Public Library, in the statement that the book encouraged children to use violence against their fathers. The library decided against removing the book, finding it a humorous and well-loved children's book designed to engage children while teaching them reading skills.

See also
 Seussical

External links
 Seussville

References

1963 children's books
Books by Dr. Seuss
American picture books
Random House books